Bouteloua breviseta is a species of grass known by the common names gypsum grama and chino grama.

Distribution
It is native to the Chihuahuan Desert, in New Mexico and Texas in the United States and Chihuahua on the northern Mexican Plateau in Mexico.

Description
Bouteloua breviseta is a perennial grass that is sometimes rhizomatous. The stems are tough at the bases and grow up to 40 centimeters tall. The leaf blades are generally just a few centimeters long.

The inflorescence is 2 to 4 centimeters long and may have branches. The grass mainly reproduces by budding, and sometimes by seed.

Uses
This grass is used for grazing and it may be added to a hay mix. It does not stand up to overgrazing, but it is adaptable to poor conditions and it can take hold where other grasses cannot grow.

References

External links
NatureServe: Bouteloua breviseta

breviseta
Grasses of Mexico
Grasses of the United States
Flora of the Chihuahuan Desert
Flora of Chihuahua (state)
Flora of New Mexico
Native grasses of Texas
Flora of the Mexican Plateau
Plants described in 1890